XHST-FM is a radio station on 94.7 FM in Mazatlán, Sinaloa. It is owned by Grupo Promomedios Radio and carries the Ke Buena national grupera format from Televisa Radio.

History
XEST-AM 690 received its concession on May 26, 1988. It operated with 2,000 watts during the day and 100 (later 250) watts at night.

XEST migrated to FM in 2011 as XHST-FM 94.7.

XHST along with XHZS and XHVU moved from Radiorama to MegaRadio in 2016, with XHST converting to MegaRadio's equivalent Romance format from Radiorama's Romántica. In 2017, Grupo Promomedios began operating XHST with an English classic hits format, which lasted mere months before a flip to Ke Buena after XHMMS jettisoned the franchise.

References

Radio stations in Sinaloa